Pagria suturalis is a species of leaf beetle distributed in East Africa (including Kenya and Tanzania), the Democratic Republic of the Congo (Garamba and Upemba National Parks), Uganda and South Sudan. It was described by Édouard Lefèvre in 1884. Its host plants include Erythrophleum guineense.

References

Eumolpinae
Beetles of the Democratic Republic of the Congo
Beetles described in 1884
Insects of Kenya
Insects of Tanzania
Insects of Uganda
Insects of Sudan
Taxa named by Édouard Lefèvre